Jean-Augustin Franquelin (1798 – 1839), was instructed by Regnault, and became known through his works, representing scenes in public life, conversation-pieces, &c., which have often been copied. The painting of The Occupation of Brissac, by this artist, is at Versailles.

References

 

1798 births
1839 deaths
19th-century French painters
French male painters
Painters from Paris
19th-century French male artists
18th-century French male artists